Templeuve Castle, also known as Castle of Formanoir de La Cazerie, is a castle in Templeuve Belgium.

See also
List of castles in Belgium

External links
Château Templeuve, Castles of Hainaut

Castles in Belgium